Zizhou or Zi Prefecture was a zhou (prefecture) in imperial China centering on modern Zibo, Shandong, China. It existed (intermittently) from 596 until 1264.

Geography
The administrative region of Zizhou in the Tang dynasty is in modern central Shandong. It probably includes parts of modern: 
Under the administration of Zibo:
Zibo
Huantai County
Gaoqing County
Under the administration of Binzhou:
Zouping County

References
 

Prefectures of Later Jin (Five Dynasties)
Prefectures of Later Liang (Five Dynasties)
Prefectures of the Tang dynasty
Prefectures of Later Tang
Prefectures of the Sui dynasty
Prefectures of Later Han (Five Dynasties)
Prefectures of the Song dynasty
Prefectures of the Yuan dynasty
Former prefectures in Shandong
Prefectures of the Jin dynasty (1115–1234)